Juiz de Fora Vôlei (shortly, JF Vôlei) is a Brazilian men's volleyball team from Juiz de Fora, Minas Gerais. It started as a sports project at the Federal University of Juiz de Fora. It currently plays Brazilian Volleyball Superleague.

Current squad 
Squad as of November 3, 2016

Head coach:  Henrique Furtado
Assistant coach:  André Silva

References

Brazilian volleyball clubs
Volleyball clubs in Minas Gerais (state)